Asociacion Deportiva Juventud Cara Sucia is a Salvadoran professional football club based in Cara Sucia, Ahuachapán, El Salvador.

The club is currently playing in the Tercera Division de Fútbol Salvadoreño.

History
The club has played under the name Juventud 72 in the past.

Notable coaches
 Carlos Reyes (2001)
 Ernesto Lemus
 Carlos Carrero (July 2017 – December 2017)
 Nelson Boteo (December 2017– February 2018)
 Ronald Rojas
 Salvador Morataya
 Carlos Alvarenga (August 2020 - December 2020)

External links
 
Juventud 72 va directo a tercera – La Prensa Gráfica 

Juventud Cara Sucia